Biedronka is a chain of supermarkets. It is the largest chain of discount shops in Poland with 3,283 stores as of 2022 and 70,000 employees (2022). It is owned by the Portuguese group Jerónimo Martins. The name "Biedronka" means "ladybug", and a cartoon ladybug is the company's logo.

Biedronka sells mainly local products, many of which are manufactured under the company's own label. It also sells some Portuguese-made products, mostly wine. Initially targeted at lower-income customers, it is now one of the most popular supermarket chains in Poland.

Biedronka has had a dominant position in Poland's grocery retail market for over a decade, and its main competitor in Poland is Lidl.

History 
The founder of the Biedronka was an entrepreneur Mariusz Świtalski, an Elektromis owner. The first shop of the "Biedronka" chain was opened in Poznań at Newtona Street on April 6, 1995.

In 1997, Jerónimo Martins bought 210 stores from Electromis, and since then dynamically developing this chain (in March 2010 in Poznań at ul. Bobrzańska was opened by 1,500 stores and by 2012, 2000 stores opened). In September 2014, the chain launched a shop № 2500, and in February 2019 store № 3,000.

In 2008, more than 120 stores of the German chain Plus and transforming them into subsequent stores of the Biedronka network took place.

In the list of "Rzeczpospolita" "List of 500 largest enterprises in Poland", from year to year, Biedronka takes up higher places. In a similar ranking developed by the weekly "Polityka" company Jerónimo Martins Polska SA took in 2009 5th place, and in 2010 — 4. On October 8, 2012 in Łódź at St. Rokicińska 366, the two-thousand Biedronka store was opened. 2500 store of chain was opened September 15, 2014 in Milanówek at St. Krolewska 21.

Gallery

References

External links 

 Unofficial forum for Biedronka employees and customers

Retail companies of Poland
Supermarkets of Poland
Retail companies established in 1995
No frills